A baseball bat is a smooth wooden or metal club used in the sport of baseball to hit the ball after it is thrown by the pitcher.

Terminology
A baseball bat is divided into several regions. The "barrel" is the thick part of the bat, where it is meant to hit the ball. The part of the barrel best for hitting the ball, according to construction and swinging style, is often called the "sweet spot." The end of the barrel is called the "top," "end," or "cap" of the bat. Opposite the cap, the barrel narrows until it meets the "handle," which is  comparatively thin, so that batters can comfortably grip the bat in their hands. Sometimes, especially on metal bats, the handle is wrapped with a rubber or tape "grip". Finally, below the handle is the "knob" of the bat, a wider piece that keeps the bat from slipping from a batter's hands.

"Lumber" is an often-used slang term for a bat, especially when wielded by a particularly able batter.

The "bat drop" of a bat is its weight, in ounces, minus its length, in inches. For example, a 30-ounce, 33-inch-long bat has a bat drop of minus 3 (30 − 33 = −3). Larger bat drops help to increase swing speed; smaller drops create more power.

History 
The bat's form has become more refined over time. In the mid-19th century, baseball batters were known to shape or whittle their own bats by hand, which resulted in a wide range of shapes, sizes, and weights. For example, there were flat bats, round bats, short bats, and fat bats. Earlier bats were known to be much heavier and larger than today's regulated ones. During the 19th century, many shapes were experimented with, as well as handle designs. Today, bats are much more uniform in design.

Innovations 

 On June 17, 1890, Emile Kinst patented the ball-bat, or banana bat. The bat is shaped with a curve, hence the name banana bat. The creator of the bat, Kinst wrote: "The object of my invention is to provide a ball-bat which shall produce a rotary or spinning motion of the ball in its flight to a higher degree than is possible with any present known form of ball-bat, and thus to make it more difficult to catch the ball, or if caught, to hold it, and thus further to modify the conditions of the game".
 The mushroom bat, made in 1906 by Spalding. With baseball bats being larger in the 1900s the Spalding company designed a larger bat with a mushroom-shaped knob on the handle. This enabled the batter to get a better distribution of weight over the entire length of the bat.
 The Wright & Ditsons Lajoie baseball bat. This bat had a normal size barrel but had two knobs on the handle. The lowest knob was at the bottom of the handle and the other knob was roughly two inches above the lowest knob. This was designed to have better spacing between the hands due to the knob being in the middle of the grip. This also gave batters an advantage when they choked up on the bat, because the second knob provided a better grip with in mushroom shaped handle.
 In 1990, Bruce Leinert came up with the idea of putting an axe handle on a baseball bat. He filed a patent application for the 'Axe Bat' in 2007 and the bat started being used in the college and pro ranks over the following years. In 2012, the Marietta College Pioneers baseball team won the NCAA Division III World Series using axe handled bats. Several Major League Baseball players have adopted the bat handle including Mookie Betts, Dustin Pedroia, George Springer, Kurt Suzuki and Dansby Swanson.

Materials and manufacture 

Baseball bats are made of either hardwood or a metal alloy (typically aluminum). Most wooden bats are made from ash; other woods include maple, hickory, and bamboo. Hickory has fallen into disfavor over its greater weight, which slows down bat speed, while maple bats gained popularity following the introduction of the first major league sanctioned model in 1997. The first player to use one was Joe Carter of the Toronto Blue Jays. Barry Bonds used maple bats the seasons he broke baseball's single-season home run record in 2001, and the career home run record in 2007. In 2010, the increased tendency of maple bats to shatter caused Major League Baseball to examine their use, banning some models in minor league play.

Manufacturers position each bat's label over the mechanically weaker side of the wood.  
To reduce chance of fracture, and maybe deliver more energy to the ball, a bat is intended to be held so the label faces sky or ground when it strikes the ball during a horizontal swing. In this orientation, the bat is considered stiffer and less likely to break.

Different types of wood will fracture differently. For bats made of ash, labels will generally be where the grain spacing is widest. For maple bats they will usually be positioned where grain is tightest. 

Maple bats in particular were once known (circa 2008) to potentially shatter in a way that resulted in many sharp edges, sometimes creating more dangerous projectiles when  Maple bat manufacture evolved significantly, in cooperation with Major League Baseball, paying special attention to grain slope, and including an ink spot test to confirm safest wood grain orientation.

Based on consistent anecdotal reports of sales at sporting goods stores, maple appears to be displacing ash as most popular new baseball bat material in the United States. Next and rising in popularity is bamboo, which has more isotropic fine grain, great strength, and less weight for a bat of any given size.

Within league standards there is ample latitude for individual variation, many batters settling on their own bat profile, or one used by a successful batter. Formerly, bats were hand-turned from a template with precise calibration points; today they are machine-turned to a fixed metal template. Historically significant templates may be kept in a bat manufacturers' vault; for example, Babe Ruth's template, which became popular among major-league players, is R43 in the Louisville Slugger archives.  Ruth favored a thinner handle than was the norm in the 1920s, and his success caused most to follow.

Once the basic bat has been turned, it has the manufacturer's name, the serial number, and often the signature of the player endorsing it branded into it opposite the wood's best side. Honus Wagner was the first player to endorse and sign a bat. Next, most bats are given a rounded head, but some 30% of players prefer a "cup-balanced" head, in which a cup-shaped recess is made in the head, introduced to the major leagues in the early 1970s by José Cardenal; this lightens the bat and moves its center of gravity toward the handle. Finally, the bat is stained in one of several standard colors, including natural, red, black, and two-tone blue and white.

Environmental threat to ash wood
The emerald ash borer, an exotic beetle imported accidentally from Asia, has killed more than 50 million white ash trees in the eastern United States and now threatens groves in New York's Adirondack Mountains that are used to make baseball  Global temperature rise likely allows the beetle to survive in what was once too cold

Regulations

In the American major leagues, Rule 1.10(a) states:
The bat shall be a smooth, round stick not more than 2.61 inches in diameter at the thickest part and not more than 42 inches in length. The bat shall be one piece of solid wood.

Bats are not allowed to be hollowed or corked—that is, filled with an alien substance such as cork which reduces the weight. This corking is thought to increase bat speed without greatly reducing hitting power, though this idea was challenged as unlikely on the Discovery Channel series MythBusters.

Both wooden and metal alloy (generally aluminum) bats are generally permitted in amateur baseball. Metal alloy bats are generally regarded as being capable of hitting a ball faster and farther with the same power. However, increasing numbers of "wooden bat leagues" have emerged in recent years, reflecting a trend back to wood over safety concerns and, in the case of collegiate summer baseball wood-bat leagues, to better prepare players for the professional leagues that require wood bats. Some amateur baseball organizations enforce bat manufacturing and testing standards which attempt to limit maximum ball speed for wood and non-wood bats.

In high school baseball in the United States:
 Its "drop" (inches of length minus ounces of weight) must be no more than 3: for example, a 34 inch (863.6‑mm) bat must weigh at least .
 The bat may consist of any safe solid uniform material; the National Federation of State High School Associations rules state only "wood or non-wood" material.
 To be legally used in a game, an aluminum bat has to be a BBCOR (Batted Ball Coefficient of Restitution) bat because it has been determined that a pitcher loses the ability to protect himself when this ratio is exceeded.

There are limitations to how much and where a baseball player may apply pine tar to a baseball bat. According to Rule 1.10(c) of the Major League Baseball Rulebook, it is not allowed more than 18 inches up from the bottom handle. An infamous example of the rule in execution is the Pine Tar Incident on July 24, 1983. Rules 1.10 and 6.06 were later changed to reflect the intent of Major League Baseball, as exemplified by the league president's ruling. Rule 1.10 now only requires that the bat be removed from the game if discovered after being used in a game; it no longer necessitates any change to the results of any play which may have taken place. Rule 6.06 refers only to bats that are "altered or tampered with in such a way to improve the distance factor or cause an unusual reaction on the baseball. This includes, bats that are filled, flat-surfaced, nailed, hollowed, grooved or covered with a substance such as paraffin, wax, etc."  It no longer makes any mention of an "illegally batted ball". In 2001, MLB approved the use of Gorilla Gold Grip Enhancer in major and minor league games as an alternative to pine tar.

Care and maintenance

Players can be very particular about their bats. Ted Williams cleaned his bats with alcohol every night and periodically took them to the post office to weigh them. "Bats pick up condensation and dirt lying around on the ground," he wrote, "They can gain an ounce or more in a surprisingly short time." Ichiro Suzuki also took great care that his bats did not accumulate moisture and thus gain weight: he stored his bats in humidors, one in the club house and another, a portable one, for the road. Rod Carew fought moisture by storing his bats in a box full of sawdust in the warmest part of his house. "The sawdust acts as a buffer between the bats and the environment," he explained, "absorbing any moisture before it can seep into the wood."

Many players "bone" their bats, meaning that before games, they rub their bats repeatedly with a hard object, believing this closes the pores on the wood and hardens the bat. Animal bones are a popular boning material, but rolling pins, soda bottles and the edge of a porcelain sink have also been used. Pete Rose had his own way of hardening his bats: he soaked them in a tub of motor oil in his basement then hung them up to dry.

Fungo bat

A fungo bat is a specially designed bat used by baseball and softball coaches for practice. The etymology of the word fungo is uncertain, but the Oxford English Dictionary suggests it is derived from the Scots fung: "to pitch, toss, or fling". A fungo is longer and lighter than a regulation bat, with a smaller diameter. The bat is designed to hit balls tossed up in the air by the batter, not pitched balls. Coaches hit many balls during fielding practice, and the weight and length allow the coach to hit balls repeatedly with high accuracy. The small diameter also allows coaches to easily hit pop-ups to catchers and infielders along with ground balls due to better control of the barrel of the bat.

See also
 Baseball doughnut
 Composite baseball bat
 Cricket bat
 List of baseball bat manufacturers
 Pink bat
 Softball bat

References

External links

 Physics and Acoustics of Baseball and Softball Bats—How baseball bats work, how bat performance is measured, differences between wood, metal, and composite bats
 Woodturning Online—Making a Baseball Bat
 "Maple, Ash Baseball Bats May Strike Out". Talk of the Nation. National Public Radio, July 4, 2008.

 Bat
Blunt weapons